The Battle of Paoli (also known as the Battle of Paoli Tavern or the Paoli Massacre) was a battle in the Philadelphia campaign of the American Revolutionary War fought on September 20, 1777, in the area surrounding present-day Malvern, Pennsylvania.  Following the American retreats at the Battle of Brandywine and the Battle of the Clouds, George Washington left a force under Brigadier General Anthony Wayne behind to monitor and harass the British as they prepared to move on the revolutionary capital of Philadelphia.  On the evening of September 20, British forces under Major General Charles Grey led a surprise attack on Wayne's encampment near the Paoli Tavern.  There were many American casualties; with inaccurate later claims that the British took no prisoners and granted no quarter, the engagement became known as the "Paoli Massacre."

Background

After the American defeat at the Battle of Brandywine on September 11, 1777, General George Washington was intent on accomplishing two tasks. He wanted to protect Philadelphia from British forces under the command of Lieutenant General Sir William Howe [5th Viscount Howe] and also shield his inland supply depots at Reading [60 miles north of Philadelphia] and Lancaster [65 miles west of the city]. Washington withdrew across the Schuylkill River on September 12, bypassed Philadelphia and headed northwest to the Falls of Schuylkill [now East Falls]. After resting for a full day and refitting, Washington's army recrossed the river at Levering's Ford [now Manayunk] on September 14 to face the British, who had moved little since Brandywine because of a shortage of wagons to carry their wounded and their baggage.  After "the Battle of the Clouds" [a battle aborted by bad weather on September 16], Washington withdrew to Yellow Springs and Reading Furnace in northern Chester County to replenish his ammunition. He left Brigadier General "Mad" Anthony Wayne's Pennsylvania Division at Yellow Springs [now Chester Springs].  When the British columns moved towards the Schuylkill River, Wayne followed under orders from Washington to harass the British and attempt to capture all or part of their baggage train.

Wayne assumed that his presence was undetected and camped close to the British lines two miles from the Paoli Tavern [Paoli, Pennsylvania]. His division consisted of the 1st, 2nd, 4th, 5th, 7th, 8th, 10th and 11th Pennsylvania Regiments, Hartley's Additional Continental Regiment, an attached artillery company and a small force of dragoons.  All told, it was about 1,500 strong. Several miles to the west and moving to join Wayne was William Smallwood's Maryland militia, about 2,100 relatively inexperienced troops.

The British heard rumors that Wayne was in the area, and General Howe sent out scouts who reported his location to be somewhere near the Paoli Tavern and Warren Tavern [now Malvern PA] on September 19.  Since his position was just  from the British camp in Tredyffrin Township, Howe immediately planned an attack on Wayne's camp.

Battle

At 10 p.m. on September 20, British commander Major General Charles Grey marched his force from the British camp and launched a surprise attack on Wayne's camp above the Warren Tavern (in present-day Malvern), not far from the General Paoli Tavern. Grey's troops consisted of the 2nd Light Infantry, a composite battalion formed from the light companies of 13 regiments, plus the 42nd Royal Highland Regiment and 44th Regiment of Foot. A dozen troopers of the 16th Queen's Light Dragoons were in the vanguard of the main British column. Altogether, this force numbered about 1,200 men.

To ensure that the Americans were not alerted, General Grey ordered that his troops should advance in silence with muskets unloaded and attack with the bayonet alone. In the case that loads could not be drawn from weapons, he ordered that the flints should be removed instead, earning the general the epithet "No Flint" Grey. In fact, Major Maitland, commanding officer 2nd Light Infantry battalion, was given permission to advance with muskets loaded, giving his personal assurance that his men could be relied on not to fire.

Earlier, Wayne had received two warnings of a possible attack and sent out videttes [mounted sentries] who spotted the British force two miles from camp and gave the alarm. Reaching the Warren Tavern, the British forced a local blacksmith to guide them and approached the camp silently along heavily wooded roads, where they hit a picket post. Most of the sentries fired into the dark, exposed their position and were annihilated by the silent British vanguard. In the camp up the hill from the pickets, Wayne's troops were already formed up and armed. Hearing the firing from the picket on the right, the main body of Wayne's force began moving west out of camp in a column through well-fenced fields when a disabled cannon blocked the avenue of escape for several minutes. Now, with loud battle cries, the British stormed into the camp in three waves, the 2nd Light Infantry in the lead, followed by the 44th and the 42nd, with light dragoons sweeping across the camp. Some of Wayne's troops fired in the direction of the British attack, exposing their positions in the dark; the rear of Wayne's column was silhouetted by their campfires. Some fired into each other and the ensuing chaos caused troops in that part of the line to panic and run. Wayne organized a rearguard defense, but many of his troops fled from the camp and were pursued for a mile or two. Near the White Horse Tavern, the British encountered Smallwood's force and routed it as well.

With casualties of only four killed and seven wounded, the British had routed an entire American division. American casualties are more uncertain. Historian Thomas J. McGuire says that 53 dead Americans were buried on the battlefield but "whether these were all of the American dead or only those found on the campsite-battlefield is uncertain". Local tradition says that eight more American (and some British) soldiers killed in the battle were buried at the nearby Anglican church of St. Peter-in-the-Great Valley. 71 prisoners were taken by the British, 40 of whom were so badly wounded that they had to be left behind in nearby houses. According to McGuire, a total of 272 men were killed, wounded or missing from Wayne's division after the battle.
McGuire reports that on the day after the battle, 52 dead Americans were buried (and another body who was found later), 39 of the buried are unnamed. The highest ranking American officer killed was Major Mareen Lamar (sometimes misspelled Marien).

Aftermath
An official inquiry found that Wayne was not guilty of misconduct but that he had made a tactical error. Wayne was enraged and demanded a full court-martial. On November 1, a board of 13 officers declared that Wayne had acted with honor.

The incident gained notoriety partly because of accounts by eyewitnesses, who claimed that the British had bayoneted or mutilated Americans who tried to surrender. Among them were the following:

I with my own Eyes, see them, cut & hack some of our poor Men to pieces after they had fallen in their hands and scarcely shew the least Mercy to any...
— Lt. Col. Adam Hubley, 10th PA Regiment.

...more than a dozen soldiers had with fixed bayonets formed a cordon round him, and that everyone of them in sport had indulged their brutal ferocity by stabbing him in different parts of his body and limbs ... a physician ... examining him there was found ... 46 distinct bayonet wounds...
— William Hutchinson, Pennsylvania Militiaman.

The Enemy last Night at twelve o'clock attacked ... Our Men just raised from Sleep, moved disorderly — Confusion followed ... The Carnage was very great ... this is a bloody Month.
— Col. Thomas Hartley, 1st PA Regiment.

The Annals of the Age Cannot Produce such another Scene of Butchery...
— Maj. Samuel Hay, 7th PA Regiment.

The military historian Mark M. Boatner III refuted these allegations, writing:

American propagandists succeeded in whipping up anti-British sentiment with false accusations that Grey's men had refused quarter and massacred defenseless patriots who tried to surrender ... The "no quarter" charge is refuted by the fact that the British took 71 prisoners. The "mangled dead" is explained by the fact that the bayonet is a messy weapon.

In any case, Wayne's troops swore revenge and "Remember Paoli!" was used by them as a battle cry at Germantown and at Stony Point.

There is a tradition that, to show their defiance, the men of the 2nd Light Infantry dyed their hat feathers red so the Americans would be able to identify them. In 1833, the Light Company of the 46th Regiment of Foot were authorized to wear red cap distinctions instead of the regulation Light Infantry green, apparently in commemoration of this gesture, and in 1934, the Royal Berkshire Regiment, which carried on the traditions of the 49th Foot, were authorized to wear a red distinction in their head dress although, misleadingly, this was granted "to commemorate the role of the Light Company at the battle of Brandywine Creek". In the second half of the 20th century, the descendants of both regiments wore red backing to their cap badges and did so until 2006 when The Light Infantry and the Royal Gloucestershire, Berkshire and Wiltshire Regiment were absorbed by The Rifles.

Monument

In 1877, a granite monument was erected at the site of the battle to replace an 1817 monument that was in poor condition; the Paoli monument inscription replicates the words of the 1817 monument on one side. It is located in a local park in Malvern that was listed on the National Register of Historic Places in 1997 as the Paoli Battlefield Site and Parade Grounds. There are two contributing buildings, two contributing sites, and five contributing objects included on the listing. They are the Paoli Battlefield Site, Paoli Parade Grounds, Paoli Massacre Monument (1817), Paoli Massacre obelisk (1877), World War I monument (1928), World War II urn (c. 1946), and caretaker's house and garage (1922).

See also
 American Revolutionary War § British northern strategy fails. Places 'Battle of Paoli' in overall sequence and strategic context.

Notes

References
 Boatner, Mark Mayo, Cassell's Biographical Dictionary of the American War of Independence 1763–1783, Cassell, London, 1966, .
 McGuire, Thomas J. Battle of Paoli. Mechanicsburg, PA: Stackpole Books, 2000, .
 
 Proceedings on the occasion of the dedication of the monument on the One Hundred Anniversary of the Paoli Massacre in Chester Co PA September 20, 1877

External links

 Paoli Battlefield Preservation Fund
 Paoli Monument Inscription
 Paoli Massacre page at USHistory.org
 Paoli Memorial at Find A Grave

National Register of Historic Places in Chester County, Pennsylvania
1777 in the United States
Conflicts in 1777
Paoli
Paoli
Paoli
History of Chester County, Pennsylvania
1777 in Pennsylvania
Conflict sites on the National Register of Historic Places in Pennsylvania
American Revolutionary War monuments and memorials
American Revolution on the National Register of Historic Places
Paoli
Paoli
1777 massacres